Teemu William Brunila (born  24 November 1976, in Turku) is a Finnish singer, songwriter, musician and producer. Brunila became known as the lead vocalist and songwriter for the pop group The Crash. During their career, the band released four studio albums and one compilation album.

Later career

After The Crash disbanded, Brunila has concentrated on writing music for other Finnish artists, including Anna Abreu, Saara and Jenni Vartiainen. He has also written songs for British acts like Pixie Lott and  JLS and American R&B artist Trey Songz. When a song "Never Again" was featured on Songz's album Chapter V, Brunila became the first Finn to have co-written a song for an album at the top of the Billboard 200 album chart.

Studio Killers

In 2011, a new virtual band Studio Killers started to gain success with their single "Ode to the Bouncer" and was said to have members from Finland, Denmark, and the United Kingdom. The group has never disclosed the identities of its members, but Brunila has been hypothesized to be the voice of the band's singer, Cherry.

Personal life

Teemu Brunila is a graduate of the University of Turku, majoring in law. He has stated, however, that he has no intentions to start practicing law.

Selected discography

Studio albums by The Crash

Songwriting and production credits

References

1976 births
Finnish male singer-songwriters
Living people
Place of birth missing (living people)
University of Turku alumni
21st-century Finnish  male singers